Marko Milosavljević (Serbian Cyrillic: Марко Милосављевић ; born 21 April 1985 in Smederevo) is a Serbian football midfielder who plays for FK Smederevo.

External links
 

1985 births
Living people
Sportspeople from Smederevo
Serbian footballers
FK Smederevo players
Serbian SuperLiga players
Association football midfielders